Paul State Forest is a Virginia state forest located in Rockingham County near the town of Ottobine.  Its  are used for a variety of purposes including research.

It had previously been part of the family farm of John Paul, Jr., a United States federal judge in Western Virginia, who donated it to the state in 1961.

References

Virginia state forests

Virginia state forests
Protected areas of Rockingham County, Virginia
1962 establishments in Virginia
Protected areas established in 1962